Haret Hreik is a mixed Shia and Maronite Christian municipality, in the Dahieh suburbs, south of Beirut, Lebanon. It is part of the Baabda District. Once an agricultural village, Haret Hreik lost its rural identity due to the wave of refugees from Southern Lebanon who settled in the town and made it another urban neighborhood of Dahieh.

On 3 September 1985, during the War of the Camps, gunmen from Amal killed thirteen Palestinian civilians in Haret Hreik.

Haret Hreik is located northeast of the Beirut–Rafic Hariri International Airport and north of the towns of Laylake and Bourj el-Barajneh, west of Hadath and south of Chyah. The town is the headquarters of the Shia group Hezbollah. Israeli warplanes destroyed the headquarters and civilian homes in July 2006.

2006 Lebanon War 

The area was largely destroyed during the 2006 Lebanon War. It was estimated that close to 200 buildings were destroyed in the town during the first week of Israel's attack on Lebanon in 2006, with a total of more than 700 structures destroyed or damaged by the end of the war and thousands of civilians injured or dead, while the international community stood still. The town has since undergone significant reconstruction, replacing destroyed and damaged buildings, with minimal help from the international community, and with maximum help from Iran.

Culture and education 
Haret Hreik houses Umam Documentation & Research, an organization handling extensive archive related to Lebanon's history. Umam also runs The Hangar, a contemporary arts space featuring regular events and exhibitions.

The town also hosts three main libraries with millions of books. The libraries are always crowded with students, readers and researchers from different ages and backgrounds. In addition to that, two main hospitals operate in the area (Sahel General Hospital and Bahman hospital), providing services to thousands of residents. The area hosts many cultural activities on regular basis, including shopping carnivals, art contests and cultural talks.

Sport 

Notable people 
Michel Aoun (born 1935), President of Lebanon
Lokman Slim (1962-2021), publisher
Samira Awad (born 2000), footballer

See also 
 2006 Lebanon War
 Targeting of civilian areas in the 2006 Israel-Lebanon conflict

References

External links
Haret Hreik, localiban
 Google map of Hurat Hurayk neighborhood, Beirut, Lebanon — Satellite photograph of the Haret Hreik neighborhood [Dahieh district], Beirut, Lebanon, before the 2006 Israel-Lebanon conflict
 High resolution DigitalGlobe photograph of Hurat Hurayk neighborhood, Beirut, Lebanon — Satellite photograph of the Haret Hreik neighborhood [Dahieh district], Beirut, Lebanon, 22 July 2006

Populated places in Baabda District
Beirut
2006 Lebanon War
Neighbourhoods of Beirut